SS Iberian was a British cargo ship that was torpedoed by SM U-28 in the Atlantic Ocean  south west of the Fastnet Rock while she was travelling from Manchester, United Kingdom to Boston, United States with a general cargo.

Construction 
Iberian was constructed in 1900 at the Sir James Laing & Sons Ltd. shipyard in Sunderland, United Kingdom. She was launched and completed in 1900. 
She had a triple expansion engine driving a single screw propeller and the engine was rated at 470 nhp.

Sinking 
While Iberian was travelling from Manchester, United Kingdom to Boston, United States with a general cargo. SM U-28 fired a torpedo at the Iberian which hit her stern killing 7 crew. Iberian sank stern first beneath the waves, officers from the U-boat reported that the steamer sank so swiftly that its bow stuck up almost vertically into the air before finally sinking shortly after the attack. It is said that along with the debris, a creature described as a "gigantic aquatic animal" resembling a crocodile was seen briefly writhing among the wreckage before disappearing.

Wreck 

References

Steamships of the United Kingdom
Ships built on the River Wear
Cargo ships of the United Kingdom
1900 ships
Maritime incidents in 1915
Ships sunk by German submarines in World War I
World War I shipwrecks in the Atlantic Ocean
World War I merchant ships of the United Kingdom